The 1923 VMI Keydets football team represented the Virginia Military Institute in their 33rd season of organized football, during the 1923 college football season. Led by fourth-year head coach Blandy Clarkson, the Keydets went 9–1 and outscored opponents 224 to 23. Tackle Charlie Barbour was All-Southern.

Schedule

References

VMI
VMI Keydets football seasons
VMI Keydets football